The year 2015 is the 6th year in the history of Australian Fighting Championship (AFC), a mixed martial arts promotion based in Australia. In 2015 AFC held 3 events.

Events list

AFC 14 

AFC 14 was an event held on September 12, 2015, at Melbourne Pavilion in Melbourne, Australia.

Results

AFC 13 

AFC 13 was an event held on June 14, 2015, at Melbourne Pavilion in Melbourne, Australia.

Results

AFC 12 

AFC 12 was an event held on March 22, 2015, at Melbourne Pavilion in Melbourne, Australia.

Results

References 

2015 in mixed martial arts
2015 in Australian sport
AFC (mixed martial arts) events